Siegel's Department Store is a historic commercial building located in downtown Evansville, Indiana. It was built in 1902, and is a two-story, Romanesque Revival style brick building.  The building was originally built to house a haberdashery.

It was listed on the National Register of Historic Places in 1982.

References

Commercial buildings on the National Register of Historic Places in Indiana
Romanesque Revival architecture in Indiana
Commercial buildings completed in 1902
Buildings and structures in Evansville, Indiana
National Register of Historic Places in Evansville, Indiana